Emilio Bozzi was an Italian businessman, known for his bicycle manufacturing company. He established the Emilio Bozzi & Co. bicycle manufacturer in Milan (1908), the first model being the "Aurora".
Also, he had the rights to the Turinese Frejus bicycle brand.  With the son of Franco Tosi, who had some patents from the English Wolsit brand, his company made the Ciclomotore Wolsit (1910–14), the rights to which was sold to NSU Motorenwerke AG (1932).

They renamed the company Legnano (the name of Bozzi's hometown) using a swordlifting legendary warrior (Alberto da Giussano) symbol painted by the cyclist Alfredo Binda, based on the Battle of Legnano.  Along with Frejus they had immediate racing success with cyclists as Eberardo Pavesi (being the manager), Alfredo Binda (1922), Gino Bartali (1936), Fausto Coppi (1939), Ferdinand Kübler (1950)  and Ercole Baldini (1956) in the Giro d'Italia, Tour de France and other races until 1965.  
The company also made mopeds (1954–68), while the bicycle business was acquired by the main rival Bianchi.

References

Year of birth missing
Businesspeople from Milan
Cycle manufacturers of Italy
Italian cycle designers